Éric Gay (born January 7, 1958 as Eric Caballero in Canala) is a French politician in New Caledonia.  He has been mayor of Le Mont-Dore since 2003.

References

1958 births
Living people
Mayors of places in New Caledonia